Triplicity is the third studio album from Red Roots. Red Hen Records alongside Daywind Music Group released the album on January 7, 2014. the last album before renaming the triplets band Taylor Red.

Critical reception

Indicating in an eight out of ten review for Cross Rhythms, Tony Cummings responds, "this could well be the album that broadens the trio's fanbase." Jonathan Andre, signaling in a four star review at Indie Vision Music, replies, "With so many life experiences and rich poignant gems of wisdom in each of these 10 tracks, Triplicity is not your average rock, pop or CCM album, and frankly, if I hadn’t heard 'Turn Around' in 2012, I may not have decided to check out Red Roots, or even write about this unique and thought provoking album today." Assigning the album a four and a half star review from Christian Music Zine, Joshua Andre recognizes, "It takes some time to get used to the genre, yet after a few times listening to the album, Triplicity sounds pretty good".

Track listing

References

2014 albums